Phakdi Chumphon is the westernmost district (amphoe) of Chaiyaphum province, northeastern Thailand.

History
Tambons Ban Chiang, Wang Thong, and Chao Thaong of Nong Bua Daeng district were separated to create the minor district (king amphoe) Phakdi Chumphon on 1 August 1988.  It was upgraded to a full district on 7 September 1995.

Geography
Neighboring districts are (from the north clockwise): Nong Bua Daeng, Nong Bua Rawe, and Thep Sathit of Chaiyaphum Province; Wichian Buri, Bueng Sam Phan, and Nong Phai of Phetchabun province.

Administration
The district is divided into four subdistricts (tambons), which are further subdivided into 47 villages (mubans). There are no municipal (thesaban) areas. There are four tambon administrative organizations (TAO).

References

External links
amphoe.com

Phakdi Chumphon